The Link is a 242-meter (791 ft), 51-story skyscraper currently under construction in Puteaux, in the La Défense district of Paris, in France. It was designed by French architect Philippe Chiambaretta. 

The tower will house the new head office of TotalEnergies. Upon completion in 2025 The Link will be the tallest skyscraper in France.

History 
In July 2017, Total chose the Link Tower to host its new headquarters. Between 5,500 and 6,000 employees, previously distributed in Tour Coupole and in Tour Michelet, will be grouped together in this new skyscraper.

On Thursday 11 June 2020, Groupama announced the start of The Link project with the destruction of the existing building in the area, which will be followed in 2021 by the construction itself.

References

External links
Official website

Skyscrapers in France
Buildings and structures under construction in France
La Défense